Dichelia is a genus of moths in the tribe Archipini.

Species
Dichelia alexiana (Kennel, 1919)
Dichelia histrionana (Frolich, 1828)
Dichelia miserabilis Strand, 1918
Dichelia numidicola Chambon, in ChambonFabre & Khemeci, 1990
Dichelia clarana Meyrick, 1881

See also
List of Tortricidae genera

References

 , 1845, Annls Soc. ent. Fr (2)3: 141. 
 , 2005, World Catalogue of Insects 5.

External links
tortricidae.com

Archipini
Tortricidae genera